Significant Mother is an American television sitcom created by Erin Cardillo and Richard Keith. Starring Josh Zuckerman, Nathaniel Buzolic and Krista Allen, it premiered on The CW network on August 3 and ended its run on October 5, 2015.

On February 16, 2016, Zuckerman said on his Twitter account that the series would not return for a second season. On February 18, 2016, Keith confirmed that.

Plot
Restaurateur Nate Marlowe (Zuckerman) is shocked to discover that his best friend and roommate, Jimmy Barnes (Buzolic), has had sex with his mother, Lydia (Allen). Nate and his father Harrison (Jonathan Silverman) find that they must face the reality that Lydia and Jimmy plan to pursue their relationship.

Cast

Main

 Josh Zuckerman as Nathaniel "Nate" Marlowe
 Nathaniel Buzolic as Jimothy "Jimmy" Barnes, Nate's longtime friend
 Krista Allen as Lydia Marlowe, Nate's mother

Guest

 Jonathan Silverman as Harrison Marlowe, Nate's father
 Emma Fitzpatrick as Sam Dillinger, Nate's employee at his restaurant
 Jay Ali as Atticus Adams, Sam's boyfriend, an organic farmer

 Denise Richards as Pepper Spinner, a notorious cougar with whom Nate ends up on a date
 Linda Gray as Gammy, Nate's grandmother and Lydia's conservative southern mother.
 Jerry O'Connell as Bob Babcock, a "slick realtor"
 Erin Cardillo as Parker, Lydia's nosy lesbian co-worker
 Mircea Monroe as Annie,  a cute girl Nate meets on the dating app "Get Forked" and begins to date

Episodes

Casting and production
Created by Cardillo and Keith, the half-hour sitcom was developed for the digital platform CW Seed. Significant Mother was ordered to series for the CW on April 10, 2015, with Zuckerman and Allen attached to star and Silverman, Fitzpatrick and Adams rounding out the cast. On May 1, 2015, Buzolic was announced in the role of Jimmy.

Later in May 2015, Denise Richards was cast as local "cougar" Pepper Spinner. In June 2015, the CW announced guest stars Linda Gray as Gammy, Nate's grandmother and Lydia's conservative southern mother, and Jerry O'Connell as Bob Babcock, a "slick realtor". In August 2015, Terry Kiser, Silverman's costar from Weekend at Bernie's, was cast in a guest role.

Broadcast
Significant Mother premiered on August 3, 2015.

Reception
Brian Lowry of Variety wrote that "while the show does possess some energy thanks to the cast, there’s such a numbing sameness to the gags." On Rotten Tomatoes, the series has an aggregate score of 25% based on 2 positive and 6 negative critic reviews.

References

External links
 
 
 
 
 
 
 
 

2015 American television series debuts
2015 American television series endings
2010s American single-camera sitcoms
Adultery in television
English-language television shows
Television series about couples
Television series about dysfunctional families
Television series by Alloy Entertainment
Television series by CBS Studios
Television series by Warner Bros. Television Studios
Television shows set in Portland, Oregon
The CW original programming